Madeleine Stegius  (born June 19, 1994) is a Swedish football forward who currently plays for  AIK Allmänna Idrottsklubben . She has played Damallsvenskan football for Djurgårdens IF and Tyresö FF.

She has played for the Swedish National Under 23 Women's squad 6 times and scored 2 goals.

Career
Stegius, born in 1994 in Nacka, started her career in the parent club Boo FF. At age 15 she trained with the star-studded Tyresö FF and a year later she wrote the contract with the club. The transition to Djurgårdens IF took place in 2012 and season 2015 will therefore be her fourth year in the blue stripes. The season 2014 came Stegius second in the goalscorers, five goals after teammate Mia Jalkerud, with 21 goals.

Stegius is one of Swedish football's most promising players and has played for the youth national teams since the age of 15. Recently she has played for the Swedish National Under 23 Women's squad 6 times and scored 2 goals.

References

External links
 

Swedish women's footballers
Tyresö FF players
Djurgårdens IF Fotboll (women) players
Damallsvenskan players
1994 births
Living people
Women's association football forwards